This is a link page for cities, towns and villages in the Republic of Ireland, including townships or urban centres in Dublin, Cork, Limerick, Galway, Waterford and other major urban areas. Cities are shown in bold; see City status in Ireland for an independent list.



A

B

C

D

E

F

G

H

I

J

K

L

M

N

O

P

Q

R

S

T

U

V

W

Y

See also 
List of places in Ireland
 List of places in the Republic of Ireland
 List of cities, boroughs and towns in the Republic of Ireland, with municipal councils and legally defined boundaries.
 List of census towns in the Republic of Ireland as defined by the Central Statistics Office, sorted by county. Includes non-municipal towns and suburbs outside municipal boundaries.
 List of towns in the Republic of Ireland by population
 List of towns in the Republic of Ireland/2002 Census Records
 List of towns in the Republic of Ireland/2006 Census Records
List of towns and villages in Northern Ireland
List of settlements on the island of Ireland by population

 
Geography of the Republic of Ireland
Lists of populated places in the Republic of Ireland